A referendum on autonomy from Spain was held in Spanish Guinea on 15 December 1963. The result was 62.52% in favour.

The result was at the time considered a step towards independence from Spain, which was achieved in 1968.

Results

References

Spanish Guinea
Autonomy referendums
Referendums in Equatorial Guinea
1963 in Spanish Guinea